The Upper Yuat languages consist of two small language families, namely Arafundi and Piawi, spoken in the region of the upper Yuat River of New Guinea. The connection was first suggested by William A. Foley and confirmed by Timothy Usher, who further links them to the Madang languages. 

Upper Yuat languages display more typological similarities with Trans-New Guinea than the other neighboring language families of the Sepik-Ramu basin (namely the Lower Sepik-Ramu and Yuat families). The Madang languages are frequently included in Trans–New Guinea classifications, but the connection is not yet demonstrated. 

The Piawi languages are morphologically much simpler than the Arafundi languages.

Pronouns
Pronouns are:

{| 
|+ Proto-Upper Yuat pronouns
!  !! sg !! pl
|-
! 1
| *ni || *an ~ *aŋ
|-
! 2
| *na || *ne
|-
! 3
| colspan="2" style="text-align: center;" | *nu
|}

The individual languages are as follows:

{| 
!  !! Harway || Hagahai || Pinai || rowspan=8|    || LowerArafundi || UpperArafundi || Awiakay
|-
! 1sg
| nɨ-ɡə|| ŋɨ-ɡə|| nɨ-ɡa|| ɲɨŋ|| niŋ|| niŋ 
|-
! 2sg
| na-ɡo|| na-ɣə|| na-ɡa|| nan|| nan|| nan
|-
! 3sg
| nu-ɡʷə|| nə-ɣʷə|| || an|| || an
|-
! 1du
! colspan=3| 
| as|| as|| as
|-
! 2/3du
! colspan=3| 
| nɨɲ|| nen|| neɲ
|-
! 1pl
| an-ɡə|| an-ɡə|| nanə-ɡa|| aŋ|| || aŋ 
|-
! 2/3pl
| ɲɨ-ɡə|| ɲe-ɡə|| ɲi-ɡa|| noŋ|| noŋ|| noŋ
|}

3rd-person *nu (number uncertain) corresponds to Piawi 3 singular and Arafundi 2/3 plural, *ne to Piawi 2/3 plural and Arafundi 2/3 dual.

Phonology
Upper Yuat languages typically have 7 vowels:
{| 
| i || ɨ || u
|-
| e || ə || o
|-
| || a || 
|}

References

Further reading
Davies, J. and Comrie, B. "A linguistic survey of the Upper Yuat". In Adams, K., Lauck, L., Miedema, J., Welling, F., Stokhof, W., Flassy, D., Oguri, H., Collier, K., Gregerson, K., Phinnemore, T., Scorza, D., Davies, J., Comrie, B. and Abbott, S. editors, Papers in New Guinea Linguistics No. 22. A-63:275-312. Pacific Linguistics, The Australian National University, 1985. 

 
Madang–Upper Yuat languages
Languages of Momase Region